Saint-Oyen may refer to:

Saint-Oyen, Savoie, in France
Saint-Oyen, Aosta Valley, in Italy
Saint-Oyens, in Switzerland